Lesbian, gay, bisexual and transgender (LGBT) people in Tibet face legal and social difficulties not experienced by non-LGBT persons.  The lands comprising the Tibetan Plateau are divided between the sovereignty of the People's Republic of China and the Republic of India. In China, same-sex sexual activity was legalised in 1997 and in India since 2018.

There are no known Tibetan support groups, however Han Chinese living in Tibet have been known to establish community structures, such as bars like the reported Lanse Tian Kong, translated "Blue Sky", in Lhasa.

According to a number of interviews by a reporter from a Singapore-based Asian gay website, Tibetan youth are mostly lax about homosexuality, but Tibetan culture does not allow for public displays of affection. However, as some argue, this is not specific as homophobia, rather, any public display of sexuality is generally frowned upon, partly due to Buddhism's glorification of celibacy.

Ernst Schäfer during his 1938–39 German expedition to Tibet in his account of Tibetan homosexuality he describes the various positions taken by older lamas with younger boys and then goes on to explain how homosexuality played an important role in the higher politics of Tibet. There are pages of careful observation of Himalayan people engaged in a variety of intimate acts.

Tenzin Mariko, a former Buddhist monk from Dharamshala, is said to be the first out transgender woman in the Tibetan community. She has been an invited speaker for Tibetan social organizations and has had private audiences with religious leaders.

See also

LGBT topics and Buddhism
LGBT rights in China
Same-sex marriage in China

References

Tibet
Tibetan law
Tibet
Tibetan culture